Oil exploration in Puntland, an autonomous region in northeastern Somalia which is a federal state, began in the mid-2000s as a series of negotiations between the provincial administration and foreign oil companies. By 2012, exploratory wells established in the area yielded the first signs of crude oil.

Overview

Somalia has untapped reserves of numerous natural resources, including uranium, iron ore, tin, gypsum, bauxite, copper, salt and natural gas.

The Puntland region in northeastern Somalia, in particular, came to be regarded as the geological analogue of Yemen since both areas once formed a single landmass around 18 million years ago, before the Gulf of Aden rifted and separated the Horn of Africa from the Arabian Peninsula. The oil reserves discovered in Yemen's Cretaceous and Jurassic formations were therefore also thought to potentially exist in Puntland, with petroleum geologists associating the Nugaal and Dharoor blocks with the South Yemen Marib-Shabwa and Sayun-Masila basins, respectively. The cabinet member tasked with overseeing oil exploration in Puntland is Daud Bisinle, Somalia's minister of Petroleum.

2005 Puntland-Range Resources Agreement
In the 2000s, the Puntland government began official negotiations with foreign oil companies over exploration rights in the area. The provincial authorities in October 2005 granted Range Resources a majority stake in two sizable land-based mineral and hydrocarbon exploration licenses, in addition to offshore rights. The onshore Nugaal and Dharoor Valley blocks in question span over 14,424 km2 and 24,908 km2, respectively. Two years later, Range Resources obtained a 100% interest in the two blocks and concurrently farmed out 80% of that share to Canmex Minerals.

At the time of the 2005 agreement officially awarding the licenses to Range Resources, the Puntland government administered the entire Nugaal Valley. However, in 2007, Somaliland recaptured and have since controlled the valley's western section. On account of the uncertain security situation in this part of the Nugaal block, Range Resources have as of 2011 given priority to drilling in the Dharoor Valley.

Puntland Product Sharing Agreement
In January 2007, the Puntland administration, which was then led by President Mohamud Muse Hersi, signed the Puntland Product Sharing Agreement (PSA) with Range Resources Limited and the Canmex Minerals subsidiary Canmex Holdings (Bermuda) II Limited.

Under the terms of the both royalty-based and profit sharing agreement, Canmex would commit to two three-year periods of comprehensive oil exploration in the Nugaal and Dharoor Valley blocks. A 20-year period of exploitation would come into effect in the event of commercial oil yields, with an option to extend the duration an additional 5 years. Gross income would be allocated toward royalty payments, production costs and net profits. The royalty payments for produced crude oil would be deducted first and would be periodically issued to the Puntland government by the oil firms according to the table below.

After these deductions, up to 70% of gross income would be earmarked for unrecovered capital, operating capital and operating expenses. The remaining gross income would be set aside for profit sharing, with 50% going to the Puntland government and 50% to the oil firms. Any future taxes levied on the petroleum activities would also be paid by the Puntland administration through its share of the oil profits.

Following a change in leadership in 2009, the Puntland government, now led by President Abdirahman Mohamud Farole, sought to renegotiate the profit sharing agreement with Range Resources to ensure more favorable terms for the region.

Yields
In 2012, the Puntland government gave the green light to the first official oil exploration project in Puntland and Somalia at large. Led by the Canadian oil company Africa Oil (the former Canmex Minerals) and its partner Range Resources, initial drilling in the Shabeel-1 well on Puntland's Dharoor Block in March of the year successfully yielded oil.

References

Puntland
Petroleum in Somalia
Oil exploration